Fathers' Day is a 1997 American comedy film directed by Ivan Reitman and starring Robin Williams, Billy Crystal, Julia Louis-Dreyfus, and Nastassja Kinski. It is a remake of the 1983 French film Les Compères.

In the film, Collette Andrews (Kinski) enlists two former lovers, cynical lawyer Jack Lawrence (Crystal) and lonely, ex-hippie, suicidal writer Dale Putley (Williams) to help her search for her runaway teenage son Scott by telling each man that he is the father. When Jack and Dale run into each other and find out what is happening, they work together to find Scott and determine the identity of the actual father.

The film features an appearance by the musical group Sugar Ray. It was a major critical and commercial failure.

Plot
16-year-old Scott Andrews runs away from home with his girlfriend, Nikki. His mother Collette visits her ex-boyfriend, lawyer Jack Lawrence, telling him that Scott is really his son and wants him to find the boy: Jack refuses at first, but changes his mind when work keeps him in San Francisco overnight.

Meanwhile, writer Dale Putley is planning suicide when he gets a phone call from Collette, of whom he is another ex, and she tells him the same story.

Both men start their search with Russ, Nikki's father. Dale and Jack get little help from him, but it does lead to them meeting each other. Mistakenly assuming that they each have a different missing son, they think "both boys" are mixed up with Nikki. They decide to team up.

Jack and Dale visit Nikki's mother, Shirley, learning Nikki went on the road to follow rock band Sugar Ray. When she asks to see pictures of their sons, they finally discover Collette has told them both the same story about being Scott's father. They call her, who confesses she doesn't know which is the father, but begs them to find Scott.

The two agree and they head for Sacramento, finding Scott, drunk, lovestruck and dumped by Nikki. They bring him back to their hotel room, and when he wakes the next day, he is not pleased by the news that one of them might be his father and that Nikki is following Sugar Ray. Jack leaves Dale to watch over Scott, but he escapes by pouring coffee on Dale's lap. Dale finds Jack and they head to Reno, to Sugar Ray's next gig.

In Reno, Scott meets up with Nikki and the other groupies. Bumping into two drug dealers that he scammed out of $5,000 to buy a necklace for Nikki, he escapes, only to be accidentally run down by Jack and Dale. Now with a broken arm, Scott demands they leave him alone.

That night, the three finally bond when Scott opens up to Jack and Dale—Nikki is his first love, but his parents disapprove of her, so he ran away. When Scott tells him about the drug dealers, they try to help him. They drive to Nikki's hotel, but when Jack and Dale go inside, the drug dealers spot Scott in the car and plan to kidnap and kill him. Scott escapes in Jack's rental car.

When the two fathers emerge from the hotel, Jack assumes Scott had been lying to them the whole time and quits, deciding to go home. Just then, his wife Carrie appears, following him (and Dale) because she's been confused and concerned over Jack's odd behavior. He tells her the truth about Scott, that he could be the father.

Dale departs while Jack and Carrie argue about Jack's negative feelings for Scott, making her fear how he'll react with his own child. Seeing her point, he heads to the Sugar Ray concert, finding Dale there also looking for Scott. They find him as he confronts Nikki, who breaks up with him. Heartbroken, Scott is suddenly grabbed by the drug dealers, whom Dale and Jack attack, resulting in a huge fight erupting in the concert crowd.

Freed from jail the next day, Jack, Dale, and Scott head home where Collette and his father Bob embrace their son. She tells Scott that neither Jack nor Dale is his dad, but he is touched that his parents wanted him home so badly. Before Jack and Dale go, Scott lies to both, separately and privately, that they're the father. Jack realises Scott lied, but is happy as he now has a new view of having children.

Dale, having borrowed Jack's car to get to the airport, spots a woman having car trouble also on her way there. Discovering Virginia is single and also heading to San Francisco, Dale offers her a lift by car, to Jack's annoyance.

Cast

Production 
Crystal and Williams had been looking for a feature film to star in together, with their only previous joint film being Hamlet (in separate scenes). Crystal was given a copy of the 1983 French comedy Les Compères by his agent at CAA. Said Crystal, "I looked at it and thought this would be great for me and Robin. I called Robin and said, ‘You gotta look at this thing.’ Robin said, ‘I love this too.’ Then I went to a dinner party at (Warner Bros. production chief) Bob Daly’s house and he said, ‘We’re excited about the prospect of you and Robin doing a movie together.’ And Ivan was there and he said, ‘What movie? Les Compères? I’m in.’ I got everybody in. I did the producer’s job. It was weird."

During filming Williams said he and Crystal mostly stuck to the script, but improvised many of their scenes.

Release
To promote the film, Crystal and Williams guest starred on an episode of Friends, a sitcom which was also produced by Warner Bros.

In South Africa, Fathers' Day was released as What's Up Pop's?, a title the distributor decided would be more appropriate for the local market. The name was subsequently changed to What's Up Pops? for DVD release, when the studio realized the apostrophe had been used incorrectly.

Box office
The film opened on May 9, 1997, finishing at #2 behind The Fifth Element with a gross of $8,776,159. Industry observers at Warner Bros. predicted the film would open with about $9 million and would gain more over the weekend. Some have speculated that one of the reasons for the film's disappointing opening was because of releasing the film around Mother's Day. In its second week, the film dropped 27% to $6.4 million, totaling to $17.5 million. The film ended with a domestic gross of $28,598,376 and a worldwide gross of $35,681,080. Against a budget of $85 million, the film was a box office bomb.

Of the film's disappointing box office run, an unnamed Warner executive said, "“When [CAA] calls and says, ‘We have a package, Father’s Day, with Williams and Crystal, and Reitman, we say 'great.' We don’t scrutinize the production. When we saw the movie, it took the wind out of us. We kept reshooting and enhancing, but you can’t fix something that’s bad."

Reception
Fathers' Day received generally negative reviews from critics. It holds a 25% approval rating on Rotten Tomatoes based on 61 reviews, with an average score of 4.2/10. The site's consensus reads: "A maudlin misfire, Fathers' Day manages the difficult task of making both Billy Crystal and Robin Williams woefully unfunny." 

In a one-star review, Roger Ebert described the film as a "brainless feature-length sitcom with too much sit and no com", lamenting its predictable plot points and "its use of runaway cliches". Ebert added, "That [the film] was recycled from the French, by the team of Lowell Ganz and Babaloo Mandel, is astonishing, given the superior quality of their collaborations like Parenthood and City Slickers." 

Among the few positive reviews were Janet Maslin of The New York Times, who wrote, "Not surprisingly, there are some slow patches and formulaic touches, but that's a fair trade for the fun of watching Mr. Williams and Mr. Crystal make an irresistible comic team", and Desson Thomson of The Washington Post. Marjorie Baumgarten of The Austin Chronicle commented, "Fathers' Day is a mildly diverting summer family comedy. In general, that's not a bad rap, but when you've got an expectant blockbuster that stars Robin Williams and Billy Crystal and has been directed by Ivan Reitman -- all of them true kings of comedy -- them words 'mildly diverting' are clearly less than the desired result."

Julia Louis-Dreyfus was nominated for the Golden Raspberry Award for Worst Supporting Actress for her work in the film, where she lost to Alicia Silverstone for Batman & Robin. The film was also nominated for Most Painfully Unfunny Comedy at the 1997 Stinkers Bad Movie Awards but barely lost to 8 Heads in a Duffel Bag.

References

External links

 
 
 

1997 comedy films
1997 films
American comedy films
American buddy comedy films
American remakes of French films
Comedy film remakes
Father's Day
Films about father–son relationships
Films about runaways
Films directed by Ivan Reitman
Films produced by Ivan Reitman
Films produced by Joel Silver
Films scored by James Newton Howard
Films set in Reno, Nevada
Films set in Sacramento, California
Films set in San Francisco
Films shot in San Francisco
Films shot in Los Angeles
Films with screenplays by Babaloo Mandel
Films with screenplays by Lowell Ganz
Silver Pictures films
Warner Bros. films
1990s English-language films
1990s buddy comedy films
1990s American films
Films based on works by Francis Veber